T cell receptor delta locus (symbol TRD), also known as TCRD or TRD@, is a protein that in humans is encoded by the TRD gene. It contributes the delta (δ) chain to the larger TCR protein (T-cell receptor).

References

Further reading 

 
 
 
 
 
 
 
 
 
 
 
 
 
 
 
 
 
 

Human genes